Keith Monin Stainton (8 November 1921 – 3 November 2001) was a British Conservative politician World War II decorated veteran.

Keith Stainton was born in Kendal, Westmorland, the son of a Kendal butcher father and a Belgian refugee mother who met during the First World War. He left school at 14 and worked as an insurance clerk from 1936 until military service.  

In early 1940 he volunteered for the Navy and was commissioned into the Royal Naval Volunteer Reserve, into submarines and served on the famous French submarine .  Part French himself, he was awarded the Légion d'honneur, the Croix de Guerre avec Palme and a citation à l'ordre de L'Armée for his spy landings and torpedo actions in the Mediterranean.

After the war he read economics at Manchester University where he was founder chairman of the Manchester University Conservative Association. From 1949 to 1952, he was a leader writer for the Financial Times. He was also a founder member of the Bow Group and first chairman of Croydon East Conservative Association. 

After working as a management consultant, he joined a major food manufacturing and distribution company and became managing director and chairman.  He was a Lloyd's underwriter specialising in maritime and aviation reinsurance.

Stainton was Member of Parliament for Sudbury and Woodbridge from a 1963 by-election until the 1983 general election, when the seat was abolished by boundary changes; he failed to win selection in either of its successor seats, South Suffolk and Suffolk Coastal. Edward Heath made him opposition spokesman on aviation in 1965.

Family

Stainton married twice, and had six children by his first wife Vanessa Ann Heald (marriage dissolved). He married Frances Easton in 1980,

References

Sources
Times Guide to the House of Commons 1966
Times Guide to the House of Commons 1979

 Obituary, The Independent, November 2001 (written by Tam Dalyell)
 Obituary, The Times, November 2001

External links 
 

1921 births
2001 deaths
Royal Navy officers
Conservative Party (UK) MPs for English constituencies
Members of the Bow Group
UK MPs 1959–1964
UK MPs 1964–1966
UK MPs 1966–1970
UK MPs 1970–1974
UK MPs 1974
UK MPs 1974–1979
UK MPs 1979–1983
People from Kendal
Royal Naval Volunteer Reserve personnel of World War II
Recipients of the Legion of Honour
British people of Belgian descent